The Federal Ministerial Police (PFM) is a Mexican federal agency tasked with fighting corruption and organized crime, through an executive order by President Felipe Calderón. The agency is directed by the Attorney General's Office (FGR) and may have been partly modeled on the Federal Bureau of Investigation of the United States. PFM agents in action often wear masks to prevent themselves from being identified by gang leaders. PFM agents are uniformed when carrying out raids.

"Street-level" uniformed federal police patrols and transport terminal security are handled by the service personnel of the National Guard.

History 
It was formed in 2009 as a reform and renaming of the Federal Investigative Agency (Agencia Federal de Investigación or AFI) which had replaced an earlier agency, the Federal Judicial Police. Some agents of the Federal Investigations Agency were believed to work as enforcers for the Sinaloa Cartel. The Attorney General's Office reported in December 2005 that 1,500 of 7,000 AFI agents — nearly 25% of the force — were under investigation for suspected criminal activity and 457 were facing charges.

In November 2008, Rodolfo de la Guardia García, the No. 2 official in the AFI from 2003 to 2005, was placed under arrest as investigators looked into the possibility that he leaked information to the Sinaloa Cartel in return for monthly payments.

On 29 May 2009, the Federal Investigations Agency was restructured and renamed.

Ranks
 Commissioner General
 Comissary General
 Chief Comissary
 Comissary
 General Inspector
 Chief Inspector
 Inspector
 Subinspector
 Officer
 Sub-Officer

Organization
 General Directorate of Ministerial and Judicial Mandates
 General Directorate of Special Security Services and Protection of Persons
 General Directorate of Police Investigation In Support of Mandates
 General Directorate of International Police Matters - Interpol
 General Directorate of Communications Center
 General Directorate of Technical Support and Logistic

Equipment

 Glock 17
 IWI Jericho 941
 IMI Galil
 IWI Ace
 IWI Tavor
 Heckler & Koch MP7
 AR-15
 M4 Carbine

See also 

 Afghan National Police
 Civil Police (Brazil)
 Federal Bureau of Investigation
 Federales
 Federal police
 Federal Security Service (Russia)
 Guardia di Finanza
 Iraqi Police
 National Police (France)
 People's Armed Police
 Royal Canadian Mounted Police (RCMP)
 Scotland Yard
 Serious Organised Crime Agency (SOCA)

References

External links 
 Attorney General's Office
 Attorney General's Office 

Defunct law enforcement agencies of Mexico
Federal law enforcement agencies of Mexico
Vicente Fox
Mexican drug war